Pétur Hafliði Marteinsson (born 14 July 1973) is a retired Icelandic football player. He played for Hammarby IF in Sweden, Stabæk in Norway and Stoke City in England during his professional career. Marteinsson was capped 36 times and scored one goal while playing for Iceland. He is the son of former Icelandic international player Marteinn Geirsson.

Club career
Marteinsson was born in Reykjavík and started his career in Fram. He moved to Swedish club Hammarby IF in 1996 where he was a great success. A sought-after defender, Marteinsson was bought by the Norwegian club Stabæk, coached by Anders Linderoth.

In November 2001, he moved on to English club Stoke City, joining up with a number of fellow Icelandic players. He made his debut against Peterborough United in January 2002. He made just two more appearances during the 2001–02 season and when Guðjón Þórðarson was sacked at the end of the season Marteinsson struggled to get a look in with new manager Steve Cotterill and then Tony Pulis. Marteinsson made 18 league appearances for Stoke scoring twice against Bradford City in 2002 before being released in September 2003.

He returned to Hammarby where he spent three years and made 48 appearances for "Bajen". In October 2006, KR Reykjavik announced they had signed Marteinsson for the 2007 Icelandic premier league season, a move which saw Marteinsson return to his native Iceland to finish his career in 2008. In his last season he won a cup.

International career
Marteinsson was capped 36 times for Iceland. He made his debut in an August 1993 friendly match against the USA as a substitute for Kristján Jónsson.

Career statistics

Club
Sources:

International
Source:

References

External links
 
 
 

1973 births
Living people
Petur Marteinsson
Petur Marteinsson
Petur Marteinsson
Petur Marteinsson
Petur Marteinsson
Hammarby Fotboll players
Stabæk Fotball players
Stoke City F.C. players
Petur Marteinsson
Expatriate footballers in Sweden
Expatriate footballers in Norway
Expatriate footballers in England
Petur Marteinsson
Petur Marteinsson
Petur Marteinsson
Petur Marteinsson
Petur Marteinsson
Petur Marteinsson
Eliteserien players
Allsvenskan players
English Football League players
Association football defenders